Faceless is the third studio album by American rock band Godsmack. The album introduced drummer Shannon Larkin, former drummer for Ugly Kid Joe. The album was released on April 8, 2003.

The songs "I Stand Alone" and "Straight Out of Line" had Grammy nominations for 'Best Rock Song' and 'Best Hard Rock Performance' respectively.

Recording and lyrical themes
The writing and recording process, according to Erna, was a self-contained one in which the band holed up in a rented home in Miami, Florida and wrote without distraction or influence from the rock music scene going on around them.

On the subject of the album, Erna told LAUNCH Media: "It's a bit more musical at times, it's a bit more melodic, but it's still raw," Erna said. "It's still tough. It's still got that Godsmack edge to it, but it's not quite as angry, maybe, as the past stuff has been. But it's still got its rawness...Well, I shouldn't say that. There's a couple of nasty fuckin' songs on this record. But all in all I think it's just really, I think, some well written stuff. I'm really proud of it." Erna found inspiration after reading Rush drummer Neil Peart's book Ghost Rider: Travels on the Healing Road, and penned the new song "Serenity", which Merrill says is similar in motif to the tribal-drum sound of Godsmack's past hit "Voodoo".

Release
Faceless debuted at number one on the Billboard 200, selling 269,000 copies in its first week, and the album would go on to sell over one million copies in the United States, Faceless beat Linkin Park's Meteora, which dropped to number two on the Billboard 200. Faceless also debuted at number nine on the Top Canadian Albums and at number one on the Top Internet Albums and remained at the specific chart for two weeks.

The second single "Straight Out of Line" received a Grammy Award nomination for "Best Hard Rock Performance." The award went to Evanescence's single, "Bring Me to Life".

Erna remembered that the band was rehearsing for the tour a few months back when they got the news that the album had debuted at number one on the Billboard 200 album chart. "Well, we were in West Palm Beach, Florida rehearsing for this tour and the call came in and it blew my mind because we worked really hard on this record and we wanted people to love it and we wanted it to do well," Erna says. "But we had no idea that it would be the Number One album in the country and it's very gratifying to know that you're rewarded at times for the hard work you do."

The song "I Fucking Hate You" appeared in the T.V. spots for the movie Pirates of the Caribbean: The Curse of the Black Pearl, albeit an instrumental version.

Reception

The album received generally mixed reviews from critics upon its release. It holds a score of 50/100 on review aggregate site Metacritic, indicating "mixed or average reviews".

Wade Kergan, writing for AllMusic, awarded the album two and a half out of five stars and commented that although the album has "successful moments", but lacks the "pop hooks" of their debut and often sounds "sorely underwritten". Chris Willman for Entertainment Weekly was similarly lukewarm towards the album, calling it "the same staccato riffing, constipated vocals, and generic, rage-against-the-kidney-stone angst." Christian Hoard of Rolling Stone also denigrated the album, awarding it two stars and commenting that although the music is "well-constructed", it "sounds like a nightmare that's more played-out than scary."

Some critics were more positive regarding the album, however. AntiMusic's review felt that the group "hit(s) a little harder" and praised the album as Godsmack's "strongest effort to date", awarding the album four stars. KNAC also awarded the album four stars and called the album "good loud aggressive heavy (slightly) pop-rock."

Track listing

Personnel

Godsmack
 Sully Erna – lead vocals, rhythm guitar, additional drums, talk box on "I Stand Alone"
 Tony Rombola – lead guitar, backing vocals
 Robbie Merrill – bass
 Shannon Larkin – drums, percussion

Additional musicians
Tommy Stewart - drums on "I Stand Alone"

Production
 Sully Erna – production
David Bottrill – production, engineering, mixing
Kent Hertz - additional engineering, Pro Tools
Marc Stephen Lee - assistant engineer, Pro Tools
Ben Meeengya - assistant engineer, additional Pro Tools
Bob Ludwig – mastering
Kurt Schneck - crew
Frank Sgambelone - crew
Kevin Sheehy - assistant
"Viggy" Vignola - programming
Richie Voutselas – crew

 Artwork
P. R. Brown - art direction, design, photography

Charts

Album

Singles

Certifications 
Faceless was certified Platinum by the Recording Industry Association of America a mere five weeks after the album's release in April.

Release history

References

2003 albums
Albums produced by David Bottrill
Godsmack albums
Republic Records albums
Universal Records albums